Nautilus-X (Non-Atmospheric Universal Transport Intended for Lengthy United States Exploration) is a rotating wheel space station concept developed by engineers Mark Holderman and Edward Henderson of the Technology Applications Assessment Team of NASA.

The concept was first proposed in January, 2011 for long-duration (1 to 24 months) exo-atmospheric space journeys for a six-person crew. In order to limit the effects of microgravity on human health, the spacecraft would be equipped with a centrifuge.

The design was intended to be relatively inexpensive  by crewed spaceflight standards, as it was projected to only cost US$3.7 billion. In addition, it was suggested that it might only need 64 months of work.

Objectives 
The original goal of Nautilus-X was to be a stopover to long-term missions for the Moon or Mars. To ease route planning of the whole mission, the station would be placed at the Lagrange point L1 or L2 of the Moon or Mars, depending on which location is to be visited.

It would also have served as an emergency station and hospital for current mission crews.

Other objectives included:
 Self-sustained for long-duration missions with crews as large as 6.
 Support crewed landing missions.
 Satisfy requirements of NASA Authorization Act of 2010.

Description

Design 

The proposal notionally included a  main corridor, a rotating habitable centrifuge, inflatable modules for logistical stores and crew use, solar power arrays, and a reconfigurable thrust structure.

The design was modular, enabling it to accommodate any of a number of mission specific propulsion modules, manipulator arms, docking port for an Orion or commercial crew capsule, and landing craft for destination worlds. In theory the engines and fuel could be swapped out depending on the mission. The proposal also had an industrial slide-out airlock unit and a command, control and observation deck.

On the other end of the docking port would have been the spacecraft's centrifuge equipped with an external dynamic ring-flywheel.  Behind the centrifuge would be water and slush hydrogen tanks, which could mitigate the dangers of cosmic radiation for the crew, to a certain degree. In the aft of the craft are the communication and propulsion systems.

The standard version of Nautilus-X had only three inflatable modules. The Extended Duration Explorer variant on the Nautilus-X design concept would have several more, plus docking bays for science payloads and away-mission vehicles.

Technologies 

In order to deploy this massive spacecraft as easily as possible, it would consist of a variety of rigid and inflatable modules and solar dynamic arrays. The expandable modules are based on the technology used by the inflatable living quarters proposed by Bigelow Aerospace, which has continued the development of inflatable modules initially designed and developed by NASA.

Attributes 
 Robust Environmental Control and Life Support and communication suite
 Large storage volumes (for food, mechanical parts or medical supplies)
 Real-time visual command and observe capability for crew
 Low crew irradiation
 Semi-autonomous integration of multiple mission specific propulsion units

Status as of 2011 

The Nautilus-X design concept did not advance beyond the initial drawings and proposal.

ISS centrifuge demonstration 
In order to assess and characterize influences and effects of the centrifuge relative to human reactions, mechanical dynamic responses and influences, the demonstration of a similar centrifuge first would be tested on the ISS. 

If produced, this centrifuge would have been the first in-space demonstration of sufficient scale for artificial partial-g effects. The demonstrator would be sent using a single Delta IV or Atlas V launcher. The full cost of such a demonstrator would be between US$83 million and US$143 million.

See also

Lunar Gateway
Lunar Orbital Station
Rotating wheel space station

References

External links
 NAUTILUS-X:  Multi-Mission Space Exploration Vehicle, Mark L. Holderman, Future in Space Operations (FISO) Colloquium, 2011-01-26.
New NASA Designs for a Reusable Manned Deep-Space Craft, Nautilus-X Popular Science, 2011-02-14.

Proposed space stations